Fords may refer to:

 Ford (crossing), a shallow crossing on a river

Places
 Fords, New Jersey
 Fords, South Australia

See also
 Ford (disambiguation)
 Ford Motor Company
 Ford's Theatre, Washington D.C., U.S.